Yantley is an unincorporated community in Choctaw County, Alabama, United States.

Tornado history
On May 1, 1953, a brief, but violent F4 tornado struck the town, killing two people and injuring three other. Almost 60 years, on April 27, 2011, another EF4 tornado hit Yantley, knocking down trees and power lines, and causing structural damage, as part of the 2011 Super Outbreak.

References

Unincorporated communities in Choctaw County, Alabama
Unincorporated communities in Alabama